The Yakovlev Yak-26, OKB designation Yak-123, was a Soviet tactical supersonic bomber aircraft flown at the Tushino air show on 24 June 1956. The model did not enter service.

Design and development
The Yak-123-1 prototype was developed from the subsonic Yak-25, and in parallel with the Yak-27 aircraft family, with the main goal of operating at supersonic speed. Although the Yak-123 kept the Yak-25's layout, it had a more streamlined and longer fuselage with a glazed nose for a navigator-bombardier, replacing the Yak-25's radome. The engines were upgraded to the much more powerful RD-9AK afterburning turbojets and the wings modified. The Nudelman N-37 cannon was replaced with two NR-23 23 mm guns. The next prototype, designated Yak-26-3, had a tail barbette with two more such guns, but it was removed altogether after testing. Additional bombs could be carried on underwing pylons. Engines were upgraded to RD-9F.

Although these designs showed potential for a supersonic bomber, they did not feature a radar, limiting their usefulness, and suffered from insufficient stability at high velocities, being prone to aileron reversals. This led to a refinement of the design, resulting in the preproduction-series Yak-26.

Although flown at the Tushino air show on 24 June 1956, only ten were produced, and the type did not enter service.

Operators

Soviet Air Force

Specifications (Yak-26)

See also

References

External links

 Yak-26 at Ugolok Neba (in Russian)
 Yak-26 from Legion.wplus.net

1950s Soviet bomber aircraft
Mid-wing aircraft
Twinjets
Aircraft first flown in 1956